Dolichyl-diphosphooligosaccharide—protein glycosyltransferase subunit STT3B is an enzyme that in humans is encoded by the STT3B gene.

Function 

The STT3B protein contains a highly immunogenic minor histocompatibility antigen epitope of 9 amino acids, B6(dom1). Like ITM1 (MIM 601134), STT3B is homologous to yeast STT3, an oligosaccharyltransferase essential for cell proliferation.

See also 
Oligosaccharyltransferase

References

Further reading